Damanhour University is located in  Damanhour, Beheira Governorate, Egypt. Originally a satellite campus of Alexandria University, it was granted independent university status in 2010.

References

External links 
 Official Website.
 

Universities in Egypt
Educational institutions established in 2010
2010 establishments in Egypt